Neobisium is a genus of pseudoscorpions in the family Neobisiidae.

Species
List is incomplete.
 Neobisium beroni Beier, 1963
 Neobisium bulgaricum Redikorzev, 1928
 Neobisium carcinoides (Hermann, 1804)
 Neobisium incertum Chamberlin, 1930
 Neobisium ligusticum Callaini, 1981
 Neobisium maritimum (Leach, 1812)
 Neobisium noricum Beier, 1939
 Neobisium sakadzhianum Krumpál, 1984
 Neobisium simargli Ćurčić, 1988
 Neobisium spelaeum (Schiødte, 1848)
 Neobisium stribogi Ćurčić, 1988
 Neobisium sylvaticum (C L. Koch, 1835)
 Neobisium tothi Novák, 2017

References

Neobisiidae
Pseudoscorpion genera